Mačji Dol is a small settlement northwest of Šentlovrenc in the Municipality of Trebnje in eastern Slovenia. The municipality is part of the historical region of Lower Carniola and is now included in the Southeast Slovenia Statistical Region.

Name
Mačji Dol is also known locally as Marč(j)i Dol, from which the local adjective marovski/marovški is derived (e.g., Marovška zijalka 'Mačji Dol Cave' at the north end of the village, as well as Marovška dolina 'Mačji Dol Valley' extending southeast of the village).

References

External links
Mačji Dol at Geopedia

Populated places in the Municipality of Trebnje